The SG postcode area, also known as the Stevenage postcode area, is a group of nineteen postcode districts in England, within fifteen post towns. These cover north Hertfordshire (including Stevenage, Baldock, Buntingford, Hertford, Hitchin, Knebworth, Letchworth, Much Hadham, Royston and Ware) and east Bedfordshire (including Arlesey, Biggleswade, Henlow, Sandy and Shefford), plus a small part of south-west Cambridgeshire and a very small part of Essex.



Coverage
The approximate coverage of the postcode districts:

|-
! SG1
| STEVENAGE
| North Stevenage including Old Town and Town Centre, Great Ashby
| Stevenage, North Hertfordshire
|-
! SG2
| STEVENAGE
| South Stevenage, Bragbury End, Walkern, Ardeley
| Stevenage, East Hertfordshire
|-
! SG3
| KNEBWORTH
| Knebworth, Datchworth, Woolmer Green
| North Hertfordshire, East Hertfordshire, Welwyn Hatfield
|-
! SG4
| HITCHIN
| Hitchin (east), Codicote, Kimpton, Weston, St Ippolyts, Little Wymondley, Whitwell, Graveley, Great Wymondley, Breachwood Green, Gosmore, Preston, St Paul's Walden, Langley, Bendish, Ley Green, King's Walden, Hall's Green  
| North Hertfordshire
|-
! SG5
| HITCHIN
| Hitchin (west), Stotfold, Ickleford, Shillington, Offley, Fairfield, Pirton, Holwell, Apsley End, Hexton, Charlton, Astwick, Pegsdon, Higham Gobion  
| North Hertfordshire, Central Bedfordshire
|-
! style="background:#FFFFFF;"|SG6
| style="background:#FFFFFF;"|HITCHIN
| style="background:#FFFFFF;"|
| style="background:#FFFFFF;"|non-geographic
|-
! SG6
| LETCHWORTH GARDEN CITY
| Letchworth, Norton, Willian
| North Hertfordshire
|-
! SG7
| BALDOCK
| Baldock, Ashwell, Hinxworth, Wallington, Newnham, Bygrave, Radwell, Clothall, Odsey, Caldecote
| North Hertfordshire, South Cambridgeshire
|-
! SG8
| ROYSTON
| Royston, Abington Pigotts, Arrington, Barkway, Barley, Bassingbourn, Chrishall, Croydon, Fowlmere, Great Chishill, Guilden Morden, Heydon, Kelshall, Kneesworth, Litlington, Little Chishill, Melbourn, Meldreth, New Wimpole, Nuthampstead, Orwell, Reed, Shepreth, Shingay, Steeple Morden, Tadlow, Therfield, Thriplow, Wendy, Whaddon
  
| North Hertfordshire, South Cambridgeshire, Uttlesford
|-
! SG9
| BUNTINGFORD
| Buntingford, Cottered, Great Hormead, Furneux Pelham, Brent Pelham, Stocking Pelham, Hare Street, Anstey, Westmill, Wyddial, Buckland, Aspenden, Chipping, Sandon, Rushden, Throcking, Meesden, Little Hormead
| East Hertfordshire, North Hertfordshire
|-
! SG10
| MUCH HADHAM
| Much Hadham, Perry Green
| East Hertfordshire
|-
! SG11
| WARE
| Albury, Braughing, Bury Green, Colliers End, Haultwick, High Cross, Little Hadham, Nasty, Patmore Heath, Puckeridge, Standon, Standon Green End
| East Hertfordshire
|-
! SG12
| WARE
| Ware, Great Amwell, Stanstead Abbotts, Stanstead St Margarets, Widford, Hunsdon, Thundridge, Wadesmill, Dane End, Tonwell, Chapmore End, Wareside, Babbs Green, Sacombe
| East Hertfordshire
|-
! SG13
| HERTFORD
| Hertford, Newgate Street Village, Bayford, Brickendon
| East Hertfordshire, Welwyn Hatfield
|-
! SG14
| HERTFORD
| Watton-at-Stone, Bramfield, Waterford, Hertford (part)
| East Hertfordshire
|-
! SG15
| ARLESEY
| Arlesey
| Central Bedfordshire
|-
! SG16
| HENLOW
| Henlow, Henlow Camp, Lower Stondon, Upper Stondon
| Central Bedfordshire
|-
! SG17
| SHEFFORD
| Shefford, Clifton, Meppershall, Campton, Chicksands, Beadlow, Deadman's Cross
| Central Bedfordshire
|-
! SG18
| BIGGLESWADE
| Biggleswade, Langford, Lower Caldecote, Northill, Upper Caldecote
| Central Bedfordshire
|-
! SG19
| SANDY
| Sandy, Potton, Gamlingay, Great Gransden, Wrestlingworth, Tempsford, Everton, Waresley, Little Gransden, Sutton, Beeston, Hatley, Eyeworth, Cockayne Hatley, Hatch, Thorncote Green, Budna
| Central Bedfordshire, South Cambridgeshire, Huntingdonshire
|}

Map

See also
Postcode Address File
List of postcode areas in the United Kingdom
Stevenage mail centre

References

External links
Royal Mail's Postcode Address File
A quick introduction to Royal Mail's Postcode Address File (PAF)

Stevenage
Hitchin
Postcode areas covering the East of England
Welwyn Hatfield
Biggleswade